Jerry O'Mahoney (born 19?? in Reenard, County Kerry) was an Irish sportsperson.  He plays Gaelic football with his local club Renard and Kerry before he immigrated to London.

Jerry played minor and Under 21 for Kerry before he emigrated to London in 1970. He was one of the stars as London beat Dublin in the Junior All Ireland final of 1971 and played for London in the Connaught Championship.

At club level, he played with The Kingdom club. He won six London senior Championships, five senior leagues, five Club Championships of Britain and two All Ireland 7-a-sides.

Arguably the greatest Kerry footballer ever to play in England. In 2011 he was picked on the All Star London team 1960–2010.

References
 http://terracetalk.com/articles/296/Honouring-Five-Kerrymen-on-the-Greatest-London-team-1960--2010

Year of birth missing (living people)
Living people
Kerry inter-county Gaelic footballers
Kingdom Kerry Gaels Gaelic footballers
Renard Gaelic footballers
South Kerry Gaelic footballers